Deep Gap is an unincorporated community located in Watauga County, North Carolina, United States.  The community is named after the natural gap, called Deep Gap, at Fire Scale Mountain, where the Blue Ridge Parkway crosses over US 421.  Influential guitar player Doc Watson was born in Deep Gap and lived there until his death May 29, 2012.

History
In 1887, the Gap Creek Baptist Church was established.

Notable people
 Doc Watson, guitar player
 Merle Watson, musician, son of Doc

See also
 Powder Horn Mountain
 Tomkins Knob

References

Unincorporated communities in Watauga County, North Carolina
Unincorporated communities in North Carolina